Más Grande Que Tú is the debut album by Puerto Rican reggaeton artist Miguelito.

Track listing

Deluxe Edition

Charts

References

External links
 
 
 
 

Miguelito (singer) albums
2006 albums
Hip hop albums by American artists
Albums produced by Rafy Mercenario
Machete Music albums